Jemima Woods (born 28 May 2003) is an Australian rules footballer playing for the Richmond Football Club in the AFL Women's (AFLW). 

Graham was signed by the Western Bulldogs in January 2022 as a replacement for Kirsten McLeod who was moved to the inactive list. 

She made her debut against  at the Whitten Oval in the fourth round of the 2022 season.

She was delisted by the Western Bulldogs and subsequently signed by Richmond as a delisted free agent.  

She made her debut for Richmond against  at Punt Road Oval in the fifth round of AFL Women's season seven.

Statistics
Statistics are correct to end S7 (2022)

|-
| 2022 ||  
| 28 || 3 || 0 || 0 || 1 || 1 || 2 || 0 || 5 || 0.0 || 0.0 || 0.5 || 0.5 || 1.0 || 0.0 || 2.5 
|-
| S7 (2022) || 
| 29 || 5 || 0 || 1 || 9 || 7 || 16 || 2 || 2 || 0.0 || 0.0 || 1.8 || 1.4 || 3.2 || 0.4 || 0.4
|- 
|- class="sortbottom"
! colspan=3| Career
! 7
! 0
! 1
! 10
! 8
! 18
! 2
! 7
! 0.0
! 0.1
! 1.4
! 1.1
! 2.6
! 0.3
! 1.0
|}

References

External links

2003 births
Living people
Richmond Football Club (AFLW) players